Júlio César Redecker (July 12, 1956 – July 17, 2007) was a Brazilian politician and a member of the opposition party, Brazilian Social Democracy Party (PSDB). Redecker was the leader of the minority in the Brazilian Chamber of Deputies. Redecker died aboard TAM Airlines Flight 3054, which crashed after landing in São Paulo on July 17, 2007. He was married and had three children.

References

External links
Official profile from the Chamber of Deputies
Official website

1956 births
2007 deaths
People from Rio Grande do Sul
Brazilian people of German descent
National Renewal Alliance politicians
Democratic Social Party politicians
Brazilian Social Democracy Party politicians
Members of the Chamber of Deputies (Brazil) from Rio Grande do Sul
TAM Airlines Flight 3054 victims